The Squad (original title: Antigang) is a 2015 French action film directed by  and starring Jean Reno. It is a remake of the 2012 film The Sweeney, which in turn was inspired by the popular television series The Sweeney.  In the UK it is marketed as "The Sweeney: Paris".

Cast 
 Jean Reno as Serge Buren
 Caterina Murino as Margaux 
 Alban Lenoir as Cartier
 Thierry Neuvic as Becker 
 Stéfi Celma as Ricci 
  as Manu 
 Jakob Cedergren as Kasper 
 Karl Amoussou as Reda
 Sabrina Ouazani as Nadia
 Jess Liaudin as Waked
 Féodor Atkine as Tancrède
 Jean-Toussaint Bernard as Boulez 
  as Genoves  
 Stephen Scardicchio as Fedor 
 Michaël Troude as Zied 
 Frédéric Dessains as Jamart
 Vincent Gatinaud as Grégoire

References

External links 
 
 

2015 films
2015 crime action films
2010s French-language films
French crime action films
Vertigo Films films
Remakes of British films
Films set in Paris
2010s French films